The Capper–Ketcham Act (enacted on May 22, 1928), sponsored by Sen. Arthur Capper (R) of Kansas and Rep. John C. Ketcham (R) of Michigan, built on Senator Capper's background running "Capper Clubs" to teach boys and girls about agriculture.  The legislation officially recognized and provided matching funds to States to create "4-H" clubs for demonstration work to enable counties to hire youth and home agents.  It also granted federal money to agricultural extension network and the work of agricultural colleges.  The "Future Farmers of America" (FFA) was founded through the Act.

See also
 Morrill Land-Grant Acts

References

External links
 
 

1928 in American law
70th United States Congress

4-H
United States federal agriculture legislation